Beaulieu-sur-Layon (literally Beaulieu on Layon) is a commune in the Maine-et-Loire department in western France. The composer and organist Louis Aubeux (1917–1999) was born in Beaulieu-sur-Layon.

Geography
The commune is traversed by the river Layon.

Population

See also
Communes of the Maine-et-Loire department

References

External links

Official site

Communes of Maine-et-Loire